The ARL Premiership was Australia's first grade rugby league competition between 1995 and 1997. It replaced the previous competition, the New South Wales Rugby League premiership, after the competition expanded to 20 teams with the admittance of four additional clubs to the competition; the North Queensland Cowboys (Townsville, Queensland), South Queensland Crushers (Brisbane, Queensland), Western Reds (Perth, Western Australia), and Auckland Warriors (Auckland, New Zealand).

History
During the Super League war of the mid-1990s the Australian Rugby League (ARL) took over control of Australia's first grade competition from the New South Wales Rugby League (NSWRL) who had run the Premiership since its inception in 1908. As the premiership expanded to Queensland, Australian Capital Territory, Western Australia, and New Zealand, the NSWRL relinquished its control to the ARL.

Although they only won one ARL Premiership in 1996, the Manly-Warringah Sea Eagles dominated the competition in its three years under the ARL name, winning each minor premiership (1995-1997), and appearing in all three Grand Finals.

The Super League War reached its peak in 1997 with News Corporation following through on plans to run its rival Super League in direct competition with the Premiership. As a result, the ARL Premiership lost eight clubs to the newly formed league: Auckland Warriors, Brisbane Broncos, Canberra Raiders, Canterbury Bulldogs, Cronulla Sharks, North Queensland Cowboys, Penrith Panthers, and Perth Reds.

At the end of 1997, after an agreement was reached between the ARL and Super League owners News Corporation, the two competitions were absorbed into the newly created National Rugby League, resulting in the immediate shut down of financially troubled clubs the Hunter Mariners (Super League), Perth Reds (Super League), and South Queensland Crushers (ARL).

Teams 

1 Played as the Gold Coast Seagulls in 1995 before being rebranded ahead of the 1996 season.

2 Rebranded from Canterbury-Bankstown Bulldogs in 1995 as a result of the Super League war.

3 Rebranded from Balmain Tigers in 1995 during the Super League war but reverted back for the 1997 season.

4 Exited to join the rival Super League for the 1997 season.

Premiers

References 

Defunct rugby league competitions in Australia
1995 establishments in Australia
1997 disestablishments in Australia
Rugby league in Australia
Sports leagues established in 1995